The Journal of Hebrew Scriptures is a peer-reviewed, open-access journal published by the University of Alberta. It was established in 1996 with Ehud Ben Zvi as the founding editor, and covers the Hebrew Bible and the history of ancient Israel and Judah. The editors are Christophe Nihan (University of Münster), Anna Angelini (University of Zurich), and Ian D. Wilson (University of Alberta).

References

Publications established in 1996
Biblical studies journals
Open access journals
University of Alberta
Academic journals published by universities and colleges